Route 350 is a  long east–west secondary highway in the northeast portion of New Brunswick, Canada.

The route's eastern terminus is in the community of Paquetville. The road travels east to the community of Rang-Saint Georges. The route then follows the Pokemouche River to the community of Maltampec before crossing the Pokemouche River. The route then continues to follow the Main Branch of the Pokemouche River to the community of Maltempec before entering the north shore of the community of Landry. From there, the road crosses another branch of the Pokemouche River before ending on the north side of Pokemouche at the intersection of Route 11 and Route 113.

Intersecting routes
no major ones

See also

References

350
350